Reading is the complex cognitive process of decoding symbols to derive meaning.

Reading also commonly refers to Reading, Berkshire, a town in England.

The common noun or verb reading (pronounced as ) or the proper noun Reading (pronounced as ) may also refer to:

Common noun or verb
 Literary and colloquial readings of Chinese characters
 Readings of kanji in Japanese
 Reading (computer), an action performed by computers, to acquire data from a source
 Reading (legislature), the mechanism by which a bill is introduced to a legislature
 Divination, gaining insight through interpretation of omens or supernatural indicators
 Psychic reading, an attempt to discern information through clairvoyance
 Dramatic reading, a dramatic art, also known as oral interpretation and interpretive reading

Art
 The Reading (Fantin-Latour), an 1877 painting by Henri Fantin-Latour
 The Reading (Manet), a c. 1865-1873 painting by Édouard Manet

Businesses and organisations
 Reading School, a British grammar school
 University of Reading, a British university
 Reading Power Station, in Tel Aviv, Israel
 Reading Works, a former factory in Pennsylvania, U.S.
 Reading Company, also called Reading Railroad and Reading Lines, an American company

Events
 Battle of Reading (871)
 Battle of Reading (1688)
 Siege of Reading (1642–1643)
 Reading and Leeds Festivals

People
 Reading (surname)
 John of Reading (died 1346), theologian
 Marquess of Reading, a title in peerage of the UK since 1926, including Earl of Reading, Baron Reading, Viscount Reading
 Marchioness of Reading (disambiguation), wife of the Marquess
 Bishop of Reading, Anglican suffragan bishop in Diocese of Oxford since 1889

Places

United Kingdom
 Reading, Berkshire
 Reading/Wokingham Urban Area, area defined by the UK Office for National Statistics
 Reading (UK Parliament constituency) (1295–1950 and 1955–1974)
 Reading East (UK Parliament constituency) (created 1983)
 Reading North (UK Parliament constituency) (1950–1955 and 1974–1983)
 Reading South (UK Parliament constituency) (1950–1955 and 1974–1983)
 Reading West (UK Parliament constituency) (created 1983)
 HM Prison Reading, in Reading, Berkshire, England

United States
 Reading, Kansas
 Reading, Massachusetts
 Reading, Michigan
 Reading, Minnesota
 Reading, Missouri
 Reading, New York
 Reading, Ohio, a city in Hamilton County
 Reading, Columbiana County, Ohio
 Reading, Pennsylvania
 Reading, Vermont
 North Reading, Massachusetts
 Port Reading, New Jersey
 Reading Township (disambiguation)
 West Reading, Pennsylvania

Other places
Reading, Jamaica

Ships
 HMS Reading (G71), a Royal Navy destroyer ship formerly USS Bailey
 USS Reading (PF-66), a U.S. Navy frigate

Sport
 Reading F.C., an English football club
 Reading Hockey Club, an English field hockey club
 Reading R.F.C., an English rugby team
 Reading Racers, an English speedway team
 Reading Town F.C., a defunct English football club
 Reading Fightin Phils, an American baseball team
 Reading (United States Baseball League), a 1912 team

See also
 
 
 Reading station (disambiguation)
 Read (disambiguation)
 Redding (disambiguation)
 Baron Astley of Reading, a title in peerage of England (1644–1688)
 Learning to read
 Measurement